Zoltán Speidl (March 17, 1880 in Losonc – July 3, 1917 in Budapest) was a Hungarian track and field athlete who competed at the 1900 Summer Olympics.

He participated in the 400 metres competition and in the 200 metres hurdles competition, but was eliminated in the first round in both events. In the 800 metres competition he advanced to the final and finished fifth.

References

External links

 profile 

1880 births
1917 deaths
Hungarian male sprinters
Hungarian male hurdlers
Athletes (track and field) at the 1900 Summer Olympics
Olympic athletes of Hungary
People from Lučenec
Sportspeople from the Banská Bystrica Region